The Fox is a traditional folk song (Roud 131) from England. It is also the subject of at least two picture books, The Fox Went out on a Chilly Night: An Old Song, illustrated by Peter Spier and Fox Went out on a Chilly Night, by Wendy Watson. The earliest version of the song was a Middle English poem, dating from the 15th century, found in the British Museum.

Modern lyrics
Typical lyrics are as follows:

Origins
In Joseph Ritson's Gammer Gurton's Garland (1810), the song is recorded (under the name "Dame Widdle Waddle") thus:
(The cover of 'The Fox' by Marty Robbins has the same lyrics as below.)

The two earliest versions both date from the fifteenth century ( 1500), and are written in Middle English. The first, usually called "The Fox and the Goose", goes as follows:

The second, called "The False Fox" ("false" here meaning "deceitful"), is as follows:

Modern covers
"The Fox" has been recorded or covered by:

1950s
 Harry Belafonte, on Mark Twain and Other Folk Favorites RCA LPM-1022, LP (1954)
 Pete Seeger, on Birds, Beasts, Bugs and Little Fishes Folkways, LP (1955)
 Burl Ives, on Burl Ives Sings... For Fun (1956)
 Odetta, on Odetta at the Gate of Horn (1957)
 Gateway Singers, on Live at Stanford (1957)
 Salli Terri, on Songs of Enchantment (1959)

1960s
 The Brothers Four, on the album Rally 'Round! (c. 1960)
 Jimmie Rogers, from the album Jimmie Rogers Sings Folk Songs (1960)
 Tom Glazer, from the Album Come On and Join in the Game (1960s)
 The Smothers Brothers, on the comedy album Think Ethnic (1963)
 Jon Pertwee, on the album Children's Favourites (1966) MFP 1175
 The Young Tradition, as "Daddy Fox," on the album So Cheerfully Round (1967) TRA 155

1970s
 MacLean & MacLean, as a parody with vulgar lyrics on MacLean & MacLean Suck Their Way to the Top
 Estil C. Ball, on High Atmosphere: Ballads and Banjo Tunes from Virginia and North Carolina (1975)
 Roger Whittaker, on the album The Magical World of Roger Whittaker (1975)
 Tom Glazer, on the album Children's Greatest Hits, Vol II (1977)

1980s
 Tim Hart, as "A Fox Jumped Up" on the album The Drunken Sailor and other Kids Favourites (1983)
 Fred Penner, on Special Delivery, LP (1983), later reissued as Ebeneezer Sneezer, (1994), CD
 A cartoon made by Weston Woods Studios (1988)
 Benjamin Luxon and Bill Crofut, on the album Simple Gifts (1989)

1990s
 Peter, Paul and Mary, on the album Peter, Paul and Mommy, Too (1993) 
 Bill Staines, on his album One More River (1998)
 Charlie Zahm, on his album The Celtic Balladeer (1999)

2000s
 Nickel Creek, on their eponymous album (2000)
 Da Vinci's Notebook, parodied as "The Gates" about a disgruntled laptop PC user going after Bill Gates on Brontosaurus (2002)
 Shira Kammen ("The False Fox", vocals by Shay Black) on The Almanac (2003)
 Eddie Blazonczyk and the Versatones, on Under the Influence (2005)
 Tom Chapin, sung/narrated as an audio book with Chapin providing all the voices (2006)

2010s
 Garrison Keillor and Guy's All Star Shoe Band, performed on a broadcast of A Prairie Home Companion (2011)
 Laura Veirs, on her album Tumble Bee (2011)
 We Banjo 3, released as a single with Sharon Shannon (2015)
 Misha Collins and Darius Marder, on a livestream (2016)
 Little Baby Bum "The Fox Song" (2016) and "The Fox and the Moon" (2019)
 Peter Hollens on his album Legendary Folk Songs (2018)
 The Petersens & Ger O'Donnell (2019)

References

External links
Folk Music Performer Index - Gro to Gz

Fox, The
15th-century songs
Fox, The
Fox, The
Fox, The
Fox, The
Fox, The
English folk songs
Fox, The